In international politics, the term gunboat diplomacy refers to the pursuit of foreign policy objectives with the aid of conspicuous displays of naval power, implying or constituting a direct threat of warfare should terms not be agreeable to the superior force.

Etymology

The term "gunboat diplomacy" comes from the nineteenth-century period of imperialism, when  Western powersfrom Europe and the United Stateswould intimidate other, less powerful entities into granting concessions through a demonstration of Western superior military capabilities, usually represented by their naval assets.  A coastal country negotiating with a Western power would notice that a warship or fleet of ships had appeared off its coast. The mere sight of such power almost always had a considerable effect, and it was rarely necessary for such boats to use other measures, such as demonstrations of firepower. 

A notable example of gunboat diplomacy, the Don Pacifico affair in 1850, saw the British Foreign Secretary Lord Palmerston dispatch a squadron of the Royal Navy to blockade the Greek port of Piraeus in retaliation for the assault of a British subject, David Pacifico, in Athens, and the subsequent failure of the  government of King Otto to compensate the Gibraltar-born (and therefore British) Pacifico.

The effectiveness of such simple demonstrations of a nation's projection of force capabilities meant that nations with naval power and command of the sea could establish military bases (for example, Diego Garcia, 1940s onwards)
and arrange economically advantageous relationships around the world. Aside from military conquest, gunboat diplomacy was the dominant way to establish new trade relationships,  colonial outposts, and expansion of empire.

Peoples lacking the resources or technological innovations available to Western empires found that their own peaceable relationships were readily dismantled in the face of such pressures, and some therefore came to depend on the imperialist nations for access to raw materials or overseas markets.

Theory 
Diplomat and naval thinker James Cable spelled out the nature of gunboat diplomacy in a series of works published between 1971 and 1993. In these, he defined the phenomenon as "the use or threat of limited naval force, otherwise than as an act of war, in order to secure advantage or to avert loss, either in the furtherance of an international dispute or else against foreign nationals within the territory or the jurisdiction of their own state." He further broke down the concept into four key areas:

 Definitive Force: the use of gunboat diplomacy to create or remove a fait accompli.
 Purposeful Force: application of naval force to change the policy or character of the target government or group.
 Catalytic Force: a mechanism designed to buy a breathing space or present policy makers with an increased range of options.
 Expressive Force: use of navies to send a political message. This aspect of gunboat diplomacy is undervalued and almost dismissed by Cable.

The term "gunboat" may imply naval power-projection - land-based equivalents may include military mobilisation (as in Europe in the northern-hemisphere summer of 1914), the massing of threatening bodies of troops near international borders (as practised by  the German Reich in central Europe in the 1940s), or appropriately timed and situated military manoeuvres ("exercises").

Distinctions 
Gunboat diplomacy contrasts with the views held prior to the 18th century and influenced by Hugo Grotius, who in De jure belli ac pacis (1625) circumscribed the right to resort to force with what he described as "temperamenta".

Gunboat diplomacy is distinct from "defence diplomacy", which is understood to be the peaceful application of resources from across the spectrum of defence to achieve positive outcomes in the development of bilateral and multilateral relationships. "Military diplomacy" is a sub-set of this, tending to refer only to the role of military attachés and their associated activity. Defence diplomacy does not include military operations, but subsumes such other defence activity as international personnel exchanges, ship and aircraft visits, high-level engagement (e.g., ministers and senior defence personnel), training and exercises, security-sector reform, and bilateral military talks.

Modern contexts

Gunboat diplomacy is considered a form of hegemony. As the United States became a military power in the first decade of the 20th century, the Rooseveltian version of gunboat diplomacy, Big Stick Diplomacy, was partially superseded by dollar diplomacy: replacing the big stick with the "juicy carrot" of American private investment. However, during Woodrow Wilson's presidency, conventional gunboat diplomacy did occur, most notably in the case of the U.S. Army's occupation of Veracruz in 1914, during the Mexican Revolution.

Gunboat diplomacy in the post-Cold War world is still largely based on naval forces, owing to the U.S. Navy's overwhelming sea power. U.S. administrations have frequently changed the disposition of their major naval fleets to influence opinion in foreign capitals. More urgent diplomatic points were made by the Clinton administration in the Yugoslav wars of the 1990s (in alliance with the Blair administration) and elsewhere, using sea-launched Tomahawk missiles, and E-3 AWACS airborne surveillance aircraft in a more passive display of military presence. Henry Kissinger, during his tenure as United States Secretary of State, summed up the concept as thus: "An aircraft carrier is 100,000 tons of diplomacy."

Notable examples

18th century
 Anson's visit to Canton in 1741

19th century
 Second Barbary War (1815)
 Haiti indemnity controversy (1825)
 Pastry War (1838–39)
 Opium Wars (1840, 1856)
 Don Pacifico Incident (1850)
 Second Anglo-Burmese War (1852)
 Opening of Japan by United States Navy Commodore Matthew C. Perry and his Black Ships (1853–54)
 Paraguay expedition (1858–9)
 Shimonoseki Campaign (1863–1864)
 Christie Affair (1861–1865)
 Shinmiyangyo in Korea (1871)
 Ganghwa Island incident (1875)
 Tonkin Flotilla (1883)
 German East Africa (1885)
 Môle Saint-Nicolas affair (1889–1891)
 Baltimore crisis (1891)
 Franco-Siamese War of 1893
 Anglo-Zanzibar War (1896)
 Luders Affair (1897)
 Yangtze River Patrol (1850s–1930s)
 Overthrow of the Kingdom of Hawaii (1893)

20th century

 Venezuela Crisis of 1902–1903 
 Panama separation from Colombia
 Great White Fleet (1907)
 Agadir Crisis (1911)
 Occupation of Veracruz (1914)
 Danzig crisis (1932)
 First Taiwan Strait Crisis (1954–55)
 Second Taiwan Strait Crisis (1958)
 Operation Vantage (1961)
 Liberation of East Pakistan (1971)
 Third Taiwan Strait Crisis (1995–96)

21st century
 Spratly Islands dispute

See also
 Fleet in being
 Deterrence theory
 Peace through strength
 Intervention (international law)
 Interventionism (politics)
 Police action

References

Further reading

 
 Cable, James: Gunboat diplomacy. Political Applications of Limited Naval Forces, London 1971 (re-edited 1981 and 1994)
 Graham-Yooll, Andrew. Imperial skirmishes: war and gunboat diplomacy in Latin America (2002).
 Healy, D. Gunboat Diplomacy in the Wilson Era. The U.S. Navy in Haiti 1915–1916, Madison WIS 1976.
 Hagan, K. J. American Gunboat Diplomacy and the Old Navy 1877–1889, Westport/London 1973.
 Preston, A. and J. Major. Send a Gunboat! A study of the Gunboat and its role in British policy, 1854–1904, London 1967.

Articles
 Long, D. F.: "Martial Thunder": The First Official American Armed Intervention in Asia, in: Pacific Historical Review, Vol. 42, 1973, pp. 143–162.
 Willock, R.: Gunboat Diplomacy: Operations of the (British) North America and West Indies Squadron, 1875–1915, Part 2, in: American Neptune, Vol. XXVIII, 1968, pp. 85–112.
 Bauer, K. J.: The "Sancala" Affair: Captain Voorhees Seizes an Argentine Squadron, in: American Neptune, Vol. XXIV, 1969, pp. 174–186

In German
 Krüger, Henning: Zwischen Küstenverteidigung und Weltpolitik. Die politische Geschichte der preußischen Marine 1848 bis 1867 (Between coastal defence and world policy. The political history of the prussian navy 1848 to 1867), Bochum 2008.
 Wiechmann, Gerhard: Die preußisch-deutsche Marine in Lateinamerika 1866–1914. Eine Studie deutscher Kanonenbootpolitik (The Prussian-German Navy in Latin America 1866–1914. A study of German Gunboat diplomacy), Bremen 2002.
 Wiechmann, Gerhard: Die Königlich Preußische Marine in Lateinamerika 1851 bis 1867. Ein Versuch deutscher Kanonenbootpolitik (The royal Prussian navy in Latin America 1851 to 1867. An attempt of German gunboat diplomacy), in: Sandra Carreras/Günther Maihold (ed.): Preußen und Lateinamerika. Im Spannungsfeld von Kommerz, Macht und Kultur, p. 105–144, Münster 2004.
 Eberspächer, Cord: Die deutsche Yangtse-Patrouille. Deutsche Kanonenbootpolitik in China im Zeitalter des Imperialismus (The German Yangtse patrol. German Gunboat diplomacy in China in the age of imperialism), Bochum 2004.

 N.N.: Die Vernichtung des haitianischen Rebellenkreuzers "Crete à Pierrot" durch S.M.Kbt. "Panther" (The destruction of the Haitian rebel cruiser "Crete à Pierrot" through His Majesty´s gunboat "Panther"), in: Marine-Rundschau, 13. Jahrgang, 1902, pp. 1189–1197.
 Rheder: Die militärische Unternehmung S.M.S.S. "Charlotte" und "Stein" gegen Haiti im Dezember 1897 (The military enterprise of His Majesty´s schoolships "Charlotte" and "Stein" against Haiti in December 1897), in: Marine-Rundschau, 41. Jahrgang, 1937, pp. 761–765.

Types of diplomacy
Banana Wars
Naval diplomacy